Group B of the 2000 Fed Cup Asia/Oceania Zone Group II was one of two pools in the Asia/Oceania Zone Group II of the 2000 Fed Cup. Five teams competed in a round robin competition, with the top two teams advancing to the play-off.

Philippines vs. Jordan

Tajikistan vs. Syria

Sri Lanka vs. Pakistan

Philippines vs. Pakistan

Tajikistan vs. Jordan

Sri Lanka vs. Syria

Philippines vs. Tajikistan

Sri Lanka vs. Jordan

Pakistan vs. Syria

Philippines vs. Syria

Tajikistan vs. Sri Lanka

Jordan vs. Pakistan

Philippines vs. Sri Lanka

Tajikistan vs. Pakistan

Jordan vs. Syria

See also
Fed Cup structure

References

External links
 Fed Cup website

2000 Fed Cup Asia/Oceania Zone